The 1992 Summer Olympics torch relay was run from May 7 until July 28, prior to the 1992 Summer Olympics in Barcelona. Antonio Rebollo lit the cauldron at the opening ceremony.

Route

References

External links

Torch Relay, 1992 Summer Olympics
Olympic torch relays